Crubeens (from Irish crúibín, meaning "pig's trotter") are an Irish dish made of boiled pigs' feet. They are traditionally eaten by hand, like corn on the cob. The Irish singer Liam Clancy references them in a preamble to the song The Galway Races, and they are mentioned in the lyrics of some versions as an example of food available at a horse race. Crubeens can include the pigs' calves, and can be consumed fried, broiled, baked, or otherwise prepared.

See also
 List of Irish dishes

References

External links
 Cruibini (Grilled Pigs' Trotters) recipe

Irish cuisine
Pig's trotters
Irish meat dishes